Qaleh-ye Mansuriyeh Jadid (also Romanized as Qal‘eh-ye Manṣūrīyeh Jadīd) is a village in Bazarjan Rural District, in the Central District of Tafresh County, Markazi Province, Iran. At the 2006 census, its population was 12, in 4 families.

References 

Populated places in Tafresh County